A list of films produced by the Bollywood film industry based in Mumbai in 1954. Boot Polish produced by Raj Kapoor went on to win the Filmfare Best Movie Award in 1955.

Mirza Ghalib, a film based on the life of well-known poet Mirza Ghalib, directed by Sohrab Modi and starring Bharat Bhushan and Suraiya went on to win the Golden Lotus Award for National Film Award for Best Feature Film in 1955.

Jagriti, directed by Satyen Bose went on to win the Filmfare Best Movie Award in 1956.

Highest-grossing films
The ten highest-grossing films at the Indian Box Office in 1954:

A-C

D-L

M-R

S-Z

References

External links
 Bollywood films of 1954 at the Internet Movie Database
 Indian Film Songs from the Year 1954 - A look back at 1954 with a special focus on Hindi film songs

1954
Bollywood
Films, Bollywood